Terellia cynarae is a species of tephritid or fruit flies in the genus Terellia of the family Tephritidae.

Distribution
Italy.

References

Tephritinae
Insects described in 1870
Diptera of Europe
Taxa named by Camillo Rondani